Denys Ihorovych Halenkov (born 13 October 1995) is a professional Ukrainian football striker who plays for Karpaty Lviv.

Career
Halenkov is a product of the ISTA Dnipropetrovsk and FC Dnipro Dnipropetrovsk youth school systems.

He made his debut for FC Olimpik in the match against FC Illichivets Mariupol on 30 May 2015 in the Ukrainian Premier League.

Desna Chernihiv
In summer 2016 he moved to Desna Chernihiv, the main club of Chernihiv in Ukrainian First League, where he played 14 games.

Polissya Zhytomyr
In 2018 he moved to Polissya Zhytomyr and with the club he got promoted to Ukrainian First League after getting second place in Ukrainian Second League, in the season 2019–20.

Karpaty Lviv
In summer 2021 he moved Karpaty Lviv in Ukrainian Second League. On 4 August 2021 he scored in the First preliminary round of Ukrainian Cup against AFSC Kyiv. On 31 August 2021 he scored in the Third preliminary round of Ukrainian Cup against Volyn Lutsk. On 5 September he made his contribue to the victory against FC Chernihiv, the second main team of the city of Chernihiv at the Ukraina Stadium in Lviv.

Honours
Polissya Zhytomyr
 Ukrainian Second League: 2019–20

Desna Chernihiv
 Ukrainian First League: 2017–18

References

External links
 
 

1995 births
Living people
Ukrainian footballers
FC Olimpik Donetsk players
FC Desna Chernihiv players
PFC Sumy players
FC Polissya Zhytomyr players
FC Karpaty Lviv players
Ukrainian Premier League players
Ukrainian First League players
Ukrainian Second League players
Association football forwards
People from Lyman, Ukraine
Sportspeople from Donetsk Oblast